The Hot Springs Railroad ran between Malvern, Arkansas and Hot Springs.

It was sometimes called the "Diamond Jo Line" because of its developer and sole owner, Joseph "Diamond Jo" Reynolds.

Construction of narrow-gauge tracks began in April 1875. Trains began operating on the 21-mile line a year later.

On October 16, 1889, it was converted from a narrow-gauge railway to standard gauge in about three hours, after several months of preparation. The Malvern brick roundhouse and turntable were modified for standard-gauge operation, and remained the principal locomotive shop for the railroad.

Reynolds was a successful steamboat operator from Chicago, Illinois. He gained the name "Diamond Jo" by marking his steamboats with the name "Jo" surrounded by a diamond. Reynolds was also known as the "Steamboat King."

Today, Hot Springs Railroad's tracks are owned and operated by Arkansas Midland Railroad , a Class III short-line railroad headquartered in Malvern.

AKMD operates  of line in Arkansas consisting of seven disconnected branch lines. The AKMD branches were originally part of the Hot Springs Railroad, and later part of the Union Pacific Railroad. All branch lines connect (interchange traffic) with Union Pacific Railroad.  AKMD also interchanges with BNSF in North Little Rock.

References

External links
 Link to Union Pacific Website with AKMD Details

Defunct Arkansas railroads